"Beat It" is a hip hop/R&B song by American recording artist Sean Kingston, featuring vocals from American singer Chris Brown and rapper Wiz Khalifa. The song is the second single from Kingston's third studio album, Back 2 Life. It was released on April 15, 2013, as a digital download. The song was written by Kisean Anderson, Cameron Thomaz, Omari Akinlolu and Nicholas Balding.

Music video
A music video to accompany the release of "Beat It" was first released onto YouTube on April 29, 2013, at a total length of four minutes and sixteen seconds. The video features Kingston, Brown, and Khalifa partying poolside at an estate, and features a guest appearance by NicNac, the producer.

Main credits
Directors/Producers - Colin Tilley, Luga Podesta, Josh Thomas, Jamar Hawkins and Brandon Bonfiglio
Director of Photography - Rob Witt
Editor - Vinnie Hobbs

Production 
Production Company - London Alley Entertainment 
Production Manager - Jenn Mickleson
Production Coordinator - Dan Browne

Editorial 
Colorist - Marshall Plante
Digital Imaging Technician (DIT) - Earl Fulcher

Costume and wardrobe
Stylist - Gianni Arteaga

Cast
 Sean Kingston, Wiz Khalifa, Chris Brown, Colin Tilley, Josh Thomas, Nic Nac

Source:

Track listing

Credits and personnel
Vocals - Kisean Anderson, Cameron Thomaz and Christopher Brown
Production - Nick "Nic Nac" Balding, Josh Thomas and Kisean Anderson
Songwriting - Kisean Anderson, Cameron Thomaz, Omari Akinlolu, Nicholas Balding, Josh Thomas and Mark Kragen
Additional Engineering - Jared Scott

Charts

Weekly charts

Year-end charts

Certifications

Release history

References

2013 singles
2013 songs
Sean Kingston songs
Chris Brown songs
Wiz Khalifa songs
Epic Records singles
Songs written by Sean Kingston
Music videos directed by Colin Tilley
Songs written by Nic Nac
Songs written by Wiz Khalifa